The Dr. Price House  is a historic site in Live Oak, Florida, United States. It is located at 702 Pine Avenue. On September 25, 1998, it was added to the U.S. National Register of Historic Places.

References

Gallery

Houses on the National Register of Historic Places in Florida
Houses in Suwannee County, Florida
National Register of Historic Places in Suwannee County, Florida